The Deniliquin Football Association (Deniliquin FA) was first established in 1900 to cater for Southern Riverina (New South Wales) Australian rules football clubs in and around Deniliquin.

History
In 1901, the Deniliquin footballers, under the name of the Commonwealth Football Club won the premiership and received premiership medals from Mr. John Moore Chanter, MHR.

In 1903, Imperials FC won the Deniliquin Football Association premiership and P Hickey won the goalkicking award.

It appears that the Deniliquin FA went into recess at the conclusion of the 1904 season, when it was superseded by the Deniliquin Half Holiday Football Association in 1905, with this competition active up until 1913, when the Deniliquin FA was re-established in early 1914.

In 1919, the Deniliquin FA was reformed after a three-year break due to World War I, with the following three club's participating – East End, Federals and Railways.

In 1923, Ron Turner, from the Mathoura Football Club won the Derbyshire Trophy for the Most Consistent Player in the Deniliquin FA.

In 1926, Australian Wallaby International Rugby Union player, Tom Lawton – Senior played Australian rules football in Deniliquin, with the East End Football Club.

Bill MacDonald played for the Colts Football Club before making his debut the Melbourne Football Club in 1929.

In August, 1930, at a meeting of the Deniliquin FA, it was decided that if larger attendees of the public were not forthcoming at local matches, the season would be abandoned, due to the effects of the Great Depression. There are no scanned copies of The Deniliquin Independent newspaper on the Trove Newspapers website from July to December, 1930 to find out who won the 1930 Deniliquin FA premiership.

Moonacullah won the 1932 Deniliquin FA premiership and were a very talented team from the Moonacullah Aboriginal Mission Station, situated on the Edwards River, 41 kilometres, west of Deniliquin. Moonacullah's first recorded match was against a combined Deniliquin FA team in 1914. For many years Moonacullah played many friendly one-off games against the Deniliquin FA and also against the Cummeragunga Aboriginal Mission football team, which was situated on the Murray River, at Barmah.

A combined Deniliquin FA use to play the Echuca FA in an annual football match for many years.

In 1933, the Deniliquin Football Club was formed and entered the Echuca Football League, which resulted in the demise of the Deniliquin FA, after 33 years.

Club Participation
The following clubs played in the Deniliquin Football Association.
 Commonwealth (Denilquin based)
 Colts (1926 – red & white)
 (Deniliquin) Rovers
 East End (red & blue), (1925, 26 – Maroons)
 Federals (red & white)
 Imperials
 Mathoura (red & blue)
 Moonacullah 1931 & 1932
 North Deniliquin
 Railways (black & white)
 South Deniliquin
 Walliston (1929 to 
 West End (green & white)

The following clubs played in the Deniliquin Half Holiday Football Association.
Citizens
(Deniliquin) Rovers
Imperials
The Natives
Number One (red & white) 1911 & 1912
Number Two (red & blue) 1911 & 1912
Number Three (black & white) 1911 & 1912

Grand Finals / Premiers
Deniliquin Football Association
1900 to 1904
1900: ?
1901: Commonwealth 
1902: ?
1903: Imperials 
1904: ?

Deniliquin Half Holiday Football Association
1905 to 1913
1905: The Natives: 10.12 – 72 defeated (Deniliquin) Rovers: 3.5 – 23.
1906: Citizens 
1907: Deniliquin Rovers 
1908: No scanned copies of The Deniliquin Independent newspaper on the Trove Newspapers website in 1908 to find out who won the 1908 Deniliquin HHFA premiership.
1909: No scanned copies of The Deniliquin Independent newspaper on the Trove Newspapers website in 1909 to find out who won the 1909 Deniliquin HHFA premiership.
1910: Imperials: 6.5 – 41 defeated (Deniliquin) Rovers: 3.6 – 24.
1911: No scanned copies of The Deniliquin Independent newspaper on the Trove Newspapers website from September to December, 1911 to find out who won the 1911 Deniliquin HHFA premiership. 
1912: No.3: 7.12 – 54 defeated No.2: 4.8 – 32.
1913: No scanned copies of The Deniliquin Independent newspaper on the Trove Newspapers website in 1913 to find out who won the 1913 Deniliquin HHFA premiership. 
Deniliquin Football Association
1914 to 1932
1914: Railways 
1915: Federals defeated Railways 
1916: DFA in recess due to World War I.
1917: DFA in recess due to World War I.
1918: DFA in recess due to World War I.
1919: Federals: 5.7 – 37 defeated Railways: 2.8 – 20.
1920: Mathoura: 6.3 – 39 defeated East End: 0.6 – 6.
1921: Mathoura: 10.12 – 72 defeated West Deniliquin: 0.4 – 4.
1922: Mathoura 
1923: Mathoura: 7.8 – 50 defeated Railways: 2.9 – 27.
1924: East End 
1925: Colts: 13.16 – 94 defeated East End: 7.11 – 53.
1926: Colts: 6.7 – 43 defeated East End: 6.3 – 39.
1927: Colts: 6.12 – 48 defeated East End: 2.10 – 22.
1928: Deniliquin Rovers: 14.14 – 98 defeated Colts: 10.10 – 70.
1929: Walliston. No grand final played. 
1930: No scanned copies of The Deniliquin Independent newspaper on the Trove Newspapers website from July to December, 1930 to find out who won the 1930 Deniliquin FA premiership.
1931: East End: 3.4 – 22 defeated Mathoura: 2.3 – 15.
1932: Moonacullah: 5.13 – 43 defeated South Deniliquin: 3.12 – 30.

References

Australian rules football in Australia
Defunct Australian rules football competitions in New South Wales
Sport in the Riverina
Sports leagues established in 1900
1900 establishments in Australia